Rheumatology (Greek ῥεῦμα, rheûma, flowing current) is a branch of medicine devoted to the diagnosis and management of disorders whose common feature is inflammation in the bones, muscles, joints, and internal organs. Rheumatology covers more than 100 different complex diseases, collectively known as rheumatic diseases, which includes many forms of arthritis as well as lupus and Sjögren's syndrome. Doctors who have undergone formal training in rheumatology are called rheumatologists.

Many of these diseases are now known to be disorders of the immune system, and rheumatology has significant overlap with immunology, the branch of medicine that studies the immune system.

Rheumatologist 

A rheumatologist is a physician who specializes in the field of medical sub-specialty called rheumatology. A rheumatologist holds a board certification after specialized training.  In the United States, training in this field requires four years undergraduate school, four years of medical school, and then three years of residency, followed by two or three years additional Fellowship training. The requirements may vary in other countries. Rheumatologists are internists who are qualified by additional postgraduate training and experience in the diagnosis and treatment of arthritis and other diseases of the joints, muscles and bones. Many Rheumatologists also conduct research to determine the cause and better treatments for these disabling and sometimes fatal diseases. Treatment modalities are based on scientific research, currently, practice of rheumatology is largely evidence based.

Rheumatologists treat arthritis, autoimmune diseases, pain disorders affecting joints, and osteoporosis. There are more than 200 types of these diseases, including rheumatoid arthritis, osteoarthritis, gout, lupus, back pain, osteoporosis, and tendinitis. Some of these are very serious diseases that can be difficult to diagnose and treat. They treat soft tissue problems related to musculoskeletal system sports related soft tissue disorders.

Diseases 

Diseases diagnosed or managed by rheumatologists include:

Degenerative arthropathies 
 Osteoarthritis

Inflammatory arthropathies 
 Rheumatoid arthritis
 Spondyloarthropathies
Ankylosing spondylitis
Reactive arthritis (reactive arthropathy)
Psoriatic arthropathy
Enteropathic arthropathy
 Juvenile Idiopathic Arthritis (JIA)
 Crystal arthropathies: gout, pseudogout
 Septic arthritis

Systemic conditions and connective tissue diseases 

Lupus
Ehlers-Danlos syndrome
Sjögren's syndrome
Scleroderma (systemic sclerosis)
Polymyositis
Dermatomyositis
Polymyalgia rheumatica
Mixed connective tissue disease
Relapsing polychondritis
Adult-onset Still's disease
Sarcoidosis
Fibromyalgia
Myofascial pain syndrome
Vasculitis
 Microscopic polyangiitis
 Eosinophilic granulomatosis with polyangiitis 
Granulomatosis with polyangiitis 
 Polyarteritis nodosa
Henoch–Schönlein purpura
Serum sickness
Giant cell arteritis, Temporal arteritis
Takayasu's arteritis
Behçet's disease
Kawasaki disease (mucocutaneous lymph node syndrome)
 Thromboangiitis obliterans
Hereditary periodic fever syndromes

Soft tissue rheumatism
Local diseases and lesions affecting the joints and structures around the joints including tendons, ligaments capsules, bursae, stress fractures, muscles, nerve entrapment, vascular lesions, and ganglia.  For example:
Low back pain
Tennis elbow
Golfer's elbow
Olecranon bursitis

Diagnosis

Physical examination
Following are examples of methods of diagnosis able to be performed in a normal physical examination.
 Schober's test tests the flexion of the lower back.
 Multiple joint inspection
 Musculoskeletal Examination
 Screening Musculoskeletal Exam (SMSE) - a rapid assessment of structure and function
 General Musculoskeletal Exam (GMSE) - a comprehensive assessment of joint inflammation
 Regional Musculoskeletal Exam (RMSE) - focused assessments of structure, function and inflammation combined with special testing

Specialized
 Laboratory tests (e.g. Erythrocyte Sedimentation Rate, Rheumatoid Factor, Anti-CCP (Anti-citrullinated protein antibody), ANA (Anti-Nuclear Antibody) )
 X-rays, Ultrasounds, and other imaging methods of affected joints
 Cytopathology and chemical pathology of fluid aspirated from affected joints (e.g. to differentiate between septic arthritis and gout)

Treatment 
Most rheumatic diseases are treated with analgesics, NSAIDs (nonsteroidal anti-inflammatory drug), steroids (in serious cases), DMARDs (disease-modifying antirheumatic drugs), monoclonal antibodies, such as  infliximab and adalimumab, the TNF inhibitor etanercept, and methotrexate for moderate to severe rheumatoid arthritis. The biologic agent rituximab (anti-B cell therapy) is now licensed for use in refractory rheumatoid arthritis.
Physiotherapy is vital in the treatment of many rheumatological disorders. Occupational therapy can help patients find alternative ways for common movements that would otherwise be restricted by their disease. Patients with rheumatoid arthritis often need a long term, coordinated and a multidisciplinary team approach towards management of individual patients. Treatment is often tailored according to the individual needs of each patient which is also dependent on the response and the tolerability of medications.

Beginning in the 2000s, the incorporation of biopharmaceuticals (which include inhibitors of TNF-alpha, certain interleukins, and the JAK-STAT signaling pathway) into standards of care is one of the paramount developments in modern rheumatology.

Rheumasurgery
Rheumasurgery (or rheumatoid surgery) is a subfield of orthopedics occupied with the surgical treatment of patients with rheumatic diseases. The purpose of the interventions is to limit disease activity, soothe pain and improve function.

Rheumasurgical interventions can be divided in two groups. The one is early synovectomies, that is the removal of the inflamed synovia in order to prevent spreading and stop destruction. The other group is the so-called corrective intervention, i.e. an intervention done after destruction has taken place. Among the corrective interventions are joint replacements, removal of loose bone or cartilage fragments, and a variety of interventions aimed at repositioning and/or stabilizing joints, such as arthrodesis.

Research directions 
Recently, a large body of scientific research deals with the background of autoimmune disease, the cause of many rheumatic disorders. Also, the field of osteoimmunology has emerged to further examine the interactions between the immune system, joints, and bones. Epidemiological studies and medication trials are also being conducted. The Rheumatology Research Foundation is the largest private funding source of rheumatology research and training in the United States.

History

Rheumasurgery emerged in the cooperation of rheumatologists and orthopedic surgeons in Heinola, Finland, during the 1950s.

In 1970 a Norwegian investigation estimated that at least 50% of patients with rheumatic symptoms needed rheumasurgery as an integrated part of their treatment.

The European Rheumatoid Arthritis Surgical Society (ERASS) was founded in 1979.

Around the turn of the 21st century, focus for treatment of patients with rheumatic disease shifted, and pharmacological treatment became dominant, while surgical interventions became rarer.

References

External links
 Association des medecins rhumatologues du Quebec
 American College of Rheumatology
 European League Against Rheumatism
 Consortium of Rheumatology Researchers of North America, Inc.
 British Society for Rheumatology
 Canadian Rheumatology Association
 Association of Rheumatology Health Professionals
 German Society for Rheumatology